Prior to its uniform adoption of proportional representation in 1999, the United Kingdom used first-past-the-post for the European elections in England, Scotland and Wales. The European Parliament constituencies used under that system were smaller than the later regional constituencies and only had one Member of the European Parliament each.

The constituency of Midlands East was one of them.

It consisted of the Westminster Parliament constituencies (under the terms of The Parliamentary Constituencies (England) Order 1970, which had taken effect at the February 1974 general election) of Blaby, Bosworth, Loughborough, Meriden, Nuneaton, and Rugby.

Members of the European Parliament

Results

References

External links
 David Boothroyd's United Kingdom Election Results

European Parliament constituencies in England (1979–1999)
Politics of Warwickshire
Politics of Leicestershire
1979 establishments in England
1984 disestablishments in England
Constituencies established in 1979
Constituencies disestablished in 1984